Forrest Smith (February 14, 1886 – March 8, 1962) was an American politician who served as the 42nd governor of Missouri. He was a Democrat.

Personal life
Forrest Smith was born February 14, 1886, near Hardin in Ray County, Missouri. After receiving his secondary education at Woodson Institute in Richmond, Missouri, Smith attended Westminster College. On October 12, 1915, he married Mildred Williams and they were the parents of two daughters, Forrestine and Mary Josephine. Smith was a Methodist.

Career
Forrest Smith began his lifelong political career in 1910 when he became deputy assessor for Ray County, Missouri. In 1914 he was elected county clerk for Ray County, a post he held for the next eight years. From 1925 to 1932 Smith served on the Missouri state tax commission, a post that laid the groundwork for a long career in statewide elected office. In 1932 Forrest Smith was elected Missouri state auditor, a post he would hold for the next sixteen years until being elected governor in 1948. According to the August 16, 1948, issue of Time magazine, Smith "helped himself get re-elected by reminding voters that he was the man who mailed out the old-age pension checks".

Gubernatorial controversies
From the outset, Forrest Smith's term as governor was followed by whisper and innuendo, primarily that he owed his election to elements of organized crime. By 1948 reputed Kansas City mobster Charlie Binaggio had rebuilt a powerful political machine from the ashes of the one originally created by Boss Tom Pendergast, which he used in Smith's favor. According to American Mafia.com:

The Smith-Binaggio connection and its effect on Mob business nationwide even played a part in Senator Estes Kefauver's 1950 Senate Special Committee to Investigate Organized Crime in Interstate Commerce, in particular the Forrest Smith for Governor Club. This mafia influence greatly tainted the relationship between Smith and the national Democratic Party. Despite this, Smith, as sitting governor, was the lead delegate to the 1952 Democratic National Convention. Additionally, the 1950 murder of Binaggio had closed off many avenues of fundraising and guaranteed votes. By now in his mid-60s with a lifetime of public service, Governor Smith retired from public life following completion of his term in January 1953. Governor Smith died March 8, 1962, in Gulfport, Mississippi. He is buried in Sunny Slope Cemetery, Richmond, Missouri.

Legacy
 The 1951 Municipal Land Clearance for Redevelopment Law. Signed by Smith, it allowed for the issuance of bonds by cities and towns statewide, which greatly expanded and improved public infrastructure such as water and sewer, as well as new industry in blighted areas.
 Forrest Lake, the centerpiece of Thousand Hills State Park near Kirksville, Missouri, is named for Smith.
 A dormitory at the University of Missouri in Columbia, Missouri also bore his name before being torn down in 2004.
 Missouri environmentalists consider an eloquent denunciation by former Governor Smith of US Army Corps of Engineers plans to construct a dam the Current River as being one of the contributing factor to the plans' defeat.

References

1886 births
1962 deaths
Democratic Party governors of Missouri
State Auditors of Missouri
Westminster College (Missouri) alumni
People from Ray County, Missouri
Methodists from Missouri
20th-century American politicians